Round 2 may refer to:

 Round 2 (J. Holiday album), 2009
 Round 2 (The Stylistics album), 1972
 Round 2 (company), a toy company based in Indiana, United States